Sinployea otareae was a species of small air-breathing land snail, a terrestrial pulmonate gastropod mollusc in the family Charopidae. This species was endemic to the Cook Islands; it is now extinct.

References

O
Extinct gastropods
Extinct animals of Oceania
Fauna of the Cook Islands
Molluscs of Oceania
Gastropods described in 1872
Taxonomy articles created by Polbot